Gramthan is a Gaupalika (rural municipality) located at Morang district. Lakhantari, Sidharaha,
Tetariya, Jhorahat, Motipur and Banigama VDCs were incorporated into Gramthan Gaupalika. This rural municipality has an area of 71.84 km2. The population as of 2017 is 32,717. The current VDC Office of Tetariya is the office of this Gaupalika.

References 

 
Rural municipalities of Nepal established in 2017
Rural municipalities in Koshi Province
Rural municipalities in Morang District